The Brampton Assembly Plant is a former automobile manufacturing facility originally owned and operated by American Motors Corporation (AMC) in Brampton, Ontario. The factory began production in 1962 to build over 1.2 million AMC cars and Jeep vehicles through the automaker's acquisition by Chrysler in 1987, until it was closed in 1992.

The plant was sold off to Wal-Mart for use as a warehouse, and the buildings were eventually demolished in the 2000s when the site was redeveloped into a power centre.

History
The factory was built at the corner of Steeles Avenue and Kennedy Road for American Motors Canada, Inc., who relocated operations from the old Danforth assembly plant (now Shoppers World Danforth) - which also previously served as the Canadian production site of the Ford Model T and Model A - to Peel-Elder's new "Peel Village" neighborhood in Brampton. The facility produced its first Rambler Classic on 26 January 1961.

The facility was composed of an assembly plant, parts warehouse, and engine plant, with an annual capacity of over 50,000 vehicles while employing 1,100 hourly and 500 salaried workers. The Rambler Classic was built on a line speed of 32 cars per shift. The facility was soon producing 33,000 cars annually in Canada. This assembly plant produced Rambler Americans, AMC Rebels, and later, Hornets, Concords, Gremlins, Spirits, and Eagles. A long rail spur was built south from Canadian National Railway's busy Halton Sub mainline to service the plant. New automobiles were loaded with ramps onto autoracks for rail shipment at the plant.

With very little Canadian production prior to 1965, American Motors was in the best position of the U.S. automakers to take advantage of the Canada–United States Automotive Products Agreement. This plant also allowed AMC to export cars within Commonwealth countries at a favorable tariff rate, making AMC the number one US nameplate in markets such as Trinidad and Jamaica in the 1960s. The assembly of Ambassador models was moved to Kenosha, Wisconsin while production of Ramblers and Rebels increased. By 1969, the output of AMC's Brampton operation was destined to the eastern half of the continent while Kenosha supplied the western regions.

In 1977, AMC hired the first female assembly worker and Cecilia Palmer became Canadian Auto Workers Local 1285's first sister, now Unifor Local 1285.

Passenger car assembly was moved from Brampton to Kenosha in 1978, and this allowed AMC to expand production of its popular Jeep CJ-5 and CJ-7 models.

As Renault increased control of AMC since 1979, the future of the old Brampton facility was in jeopardy by 1982. Renault's strategic business plan was to limit production of AMCs to Kenosha and Jeeps to Toledo as part of efforts to gain economies of scale. Moreover, local production was no longer a prerequisite for duty-free access into the Canadian market as long as the car's Canadian-sourced parts content met a minimum ratio to the total value of its sales in Canada.

Discussions to possibly utilize the assembly plant's capacity with Nissan ended in 1986, while at the time AMC's president, Jose Dedeurwaerder, a former Renault executive, made an "ominous" statement that the automaker was openly looking for a partner.

In 1987, with the Chrysler buyout, the AMC division and its plants (Brampton and Bramalea) were absorbed into Chrysler, becoming part of Chrysler Canada Limited. At the time of Chrysler's purchase, the combined total production capacity of the four of AMC assembly plants (Brampton, Kenosha, Toledo, and the brand new Bramalea Assembly in Brampton) had a combined annually total production capacity of around 700,000 vehicles. This meant overcapacity for Chrysler, and AMC's old Kenosha and Toledo factories were at the top of Chrysler's closure list. The workers in Toledo agreed to concessions to keep the factory open, but by 1990, they were pitted against Brampton Assembly and additional concessions by the Toledo employees were crucial to Chrysler's decision to close Brampton. The old Brampton factory had been building the Jeep Wrangler, which in 1992 was moved to Toledo and the Brampton plant closed.

With this transfer and closure, AMC's new Bramalea Assembly plant (that was built 1986) was renamed the Brampton Assembly and began producing the new large Chrysler LH platform models (Chrysler Concorde, Dodge Intrepid, and Eagle Vision).

Legacy
The original AMC factory was closed on 4 April 1992 and sold to Wal-Mart for use as one of their Canadian warehouses. The remains of the plant's west buildings were torn down in 2005, and the land was redeveloped for commercial/retail use. Among the buildings on the site is a Lowe's home improvement store that opened on 10 December 2007, as one of the first three to be established by the retail chain in Canada. The old factory's east building was demolished in 2007, and a Walmart Supercentre now occupies the site along with a warehouse.

Rambler Drive, a street to the west of the plant leading into the Peel Village neighborhood off Kennedy, serves as a reminder of AMC's former presence in the area.

Annual production 
American Motors' original Brampton production and products for model years (MY) from 1961 to 1992:

 

 * Note: the final AMC branded car (not Jeep), a 1988 AMC Eagle, was built on 11 December 1987, and shipped from Brampton on 15 December to a dealer in the U.S.

References

American Motors
Chrysler factories
Motor vehicle assembly plants in Canada